Yusifli, Agdam, is a village and municipality in the Agdam Rayon of Azerbaijan.
 Yusifli, Jalilabad, is a village and municipality in the Jalilabad Rayon of Azerbaijan.
 Yusifli, Masally, is a village and municipality in the Masally Rayon of Azerbaijan.